Spathiostemon moniliformis is a plant that can grow as a shrub or a tree in the Euphorbiaceae family, Acalypheae tribe. It is endemic to southern/peninsular Thailand.

Description
The species grows as a shrub or tree, in height up to 10m, with a trunk diameter at breast height up to 11 cm.
Leaves are rarely ovate tending usually to elliptic, some 6.2-26.5 x 2.3-9.5 cm in size, on both sides they are smooth and glabrous. Flowers are white to yellowish. The fruit is reddish to dark brown, smooth and glabrous, some 9 x 6mm in size. It flowers and fruits from December to March, August to September.

The species is distinguished from its sister taxa Spathiostemon javensis by the following traits: Glabrous petioles; the leaves do not have domatia; the inflorescences are glabrous, and the staminate inflorescences are from 6 to 28 cm long; the pistillate flowers have sepals in 2 whorls of 3; the ovary and fruit are smooth.

The taxa is distinguished from other Euphorbiaceae growing in Thailand by having: elliptic leaves whose basal margin has 3 black dot-like glands on either side of the midrib; the petioles are both basally and apically pulvinate; seeds do not have arilloid.

Habitat, ecology
The shrub/tree is common in evergreen forest and in secondary forests that have evergreen patches.
It grows from 10 to 200m altitude.

Distribution
The tree is endemic to southern/peninsular Thailand.

Vernacular names
Kha khao and khan laen are names used for this species in Surat Thani Province, Thailand.

History
The English botanist Herbert Kenneth Airy Shaw, who worked extensively on tropical Asian botany and entomology, described the species in 1962, in the Kew Bulletin.

References

Further reading
Govaerts, R., Frodin, D.G. & Radcliffe-Smith, A. (2000). World Checklist and Bibliography of Euphorbiaceae (and Pandaceae) 1-4: 1–1622. The Board of Trustees of the Royal Botanic Gardens, Kew.
van Welzen, P.C. & Chayamarit, K. (2007). Flora of Thailand 8(2): 305–592. The Forest Herbarium, National Park, Wildlife and Plant Conservation Department, Bangkok.

moniliformis
Acalypheae
Endemic flora of Thailand
Plants described in 1962